Mustoe may refer to:

Mustoe (surname)
Mustoe, Highland County, Virginia
Mustoe, King George County, Virginia